The German occupation of Belgium can refer to:
German occupation of Belgium during World War I (1914–18)
German occupation of Belgium during World War II (1940–44)